Thomas Iser (born September 2, 1987 in Metz, France) is a French-Luxembourgian street artist, photographer and painter.

Biography 
Iser was born on September 2, 1987 in Metz to a French father and Luxembourgian mother. He started his artistic career in 2012. Using Acrylic paint and Aerosol paint, his art is inspired by graffiti art and is directly related to his personal journey. Iser is also inspired by Japanese Kintsugi art. In 2015, he launched his project "Angel Jumps". It was a collection of photographs that was taken by Iser and with drawing angel wings on the photos. 

In 2016, Iser launched his another project "Universal Humanity". Prior to taking photograph, he asked participants to hold a card in front of their right eye and talk about their dreams. His project includes a number of personalities and artists such as Pharrell Williams, Nicole Scherzinger, Bob Sinclar, Willem Dafoe, Romero Britto, Mark Seliger, David Lachapelle and Gigi Hadid, among many others.

Exhibitions 

 2021: The MUD- Musée du déchet, Luxembourg Center for Circular Economy, Luxembourg
 2021: Circular'ISER, il y a plein à voir!, Raiffeisen, Luxembourg
 2019: Art 2 Cure, Banque Internationale à Luxembourg, Luxembourg
 2019: The heART SHOW, Arte Fundamental Gallery, Miami, Florida, USA
 2019: Mind the Brain, University of Luxembourg, Luxembourg
 2018: The Art Plug Power House, Marcel Katz, Miami, Florida, USA
 2018: Windows, GX Gallery, London, England
 2017: 75 works on paper, BEERS London, London, England
 2016: Art 2 Cure, Banque Internationale à Luxembourg, Luxembourg

Collaborations and artistic performances 

 2021: Coup de cœur 2021, Nuit des musées, Luxembourg City History Museum, Luxembourg
 2020: Collaboration avec Cathy Goedert, Luxembourg
 2019: Stay Gold Event, Live artistic performance, Athènes
 2019: Thomas Iser X Jitrois, Performance artistique live, Paris

References

1987 births
Living people
French artists
French contemporary artists
Graffiti artists
French photographers